Diana & Me is a 1997 Australian romantic comedy film directed by David Parker and starring Toni Collette, Dominic West and John Simm.

Plot
An Australian named Diana Spencer travels to London to try to get a glimpse of her namesake, Diana, Princess of Wales. Just as she is about to shake hands with the princess, she is pushed out of the way by a photographer. While she is furious with him at first, they slowly strike up a relationship.

Cast
 Toni Collette ...  Diana Spencer
 Dominic West ...  Rob Naylor
 Malcolm Kennard ...  Mark Fraser
 Victoria Eagger ...  Carol
 John Simm ...  Neil
 Serena Gordon ...  Lady Sarah Myers-Booth
 Roger Barclay ...  Richard
 Tom Hillier ...  Neville
 David Baldwin ...  Dog Owner
 Victoria Longley ...  Pauline Challinor
 Marshall Napier ...  Bank Manager
 Penne Hackforth-Jones ...  Pollock
 William Zappa ...  Phil
 Jim Holt ...  Detective
 Nigel Planer ...  Taxi Driver
 Celia Dickinson ...  Katie
 Michael Miller ... Michael - Owner of Cafe Diana
 John Turnbull ...  AA Man
 Deborah Conway... herself
 Mike Robinson... Restaurant Manager

Production
The original script was by Elizabeth Coleman. According to David Parker, the original female lead was older and more like Shirley Valentine. Parker then worked on the script with Matt Ford for 18 months.
Shooting finished in December 1996 and post production was completed in Easter 1997 by release planned for August. These plans were thrown into confusion when Princess Diana was killed in a car accident. Parker and Ford spent six weeks reworking the film, adding some new sequences and narration. David Parker later said:
There was nowhere to go with that film. We did shoot a new little top and tail for it primarily to place the movie within the past so that it would at least work chronologically. But it appeared it wasn't enough. We either came out too early with it or such was the response to Princess Diana in life and death that we were completely on the wrong page, a film that could be released only after her death.

References

External links

Diana and Me at Oz movies
Diana & Me review at Urban Cinefile
Diana & Me review at SBS Movie Show
Diana & Me review at Variety

1997 films
1997 romantic comedy films
Australian romantic comedy films
1990s English-language films
1990s Australian films